Erravaram Caves are located on the left bank of Yeleru river, at a distance of 45 km from Rajahmundry on Vishakhapatnam route. The caves are located on Dhanla–dibba hillock. The excavations revealed historic remains dated back to 100 A.D. This site flourished from 1st century B.C. to 2nd century A.D.

References 

Buildings and structures in Visakhapatnam district
Archaeological sites in Andhra Pradesh
Stupas in India
Buddhist caves in India
Buddhist monasteries in India
Indian rock-cut architecture
Former populated places in India
Buddhist pilgrimage sites in India
Caves containing pictograms in India
Caves of Andhra Pradesh
Buddhist sites in Andhra Pradesh